Sergey Prokofyevich Kvochkin (October 6, 1938 – December 29, 2007) was a Soviet Kazakhstani footballer. In 2004, he was selected as the best Kazakhstani footballer in the UEFA Jubilee Awards.

References

UEFA Golden Players
1938 births
2007 deaths
Sportspeople from Almaty
Soviet footballers
Kazakhstani footballers
Soviet Top League players
FC Kairat players
FC Vostok managers
FC Okzhetpes managers

Association football forwards
Kazakhstani football managers